Nezaket Erden (born 16 June 1990) is a Turkish actress.

She is one of the founders of the professional theatre group Tiyatro Hemhal that operates in Istanbul. She won the Best Supporting Actress Award at the 57th and 58th Antalya Golden Orange Film Festival in recognition of her work on different cinematic productions.

Life and career 
Erden was born on 16 June 1990 in Mersin. After completing her primary and secondary education in Mersin, she settled in Istanbul and studied philosophy at Galatasaray University. She entered the drama club in college. After appearing on stage for her university theatre, she studied at Akademi 35.5 Art House with a scholarship.

In 2016, she completed Kadir Has University's Film and Drama-Acting Program. As a graduation project, she worked with Hakan Emre Ünal, who was a graduate student at the same university at the time, to adapt Latife Tekin's novel Dear Shameless Death for the stage. She also staged the one-man play Dirmit, based on the main character in the novel. For her role in this play, she was received a nomination for the Most Successful Actress of the Year at the 23rd Afife Theatre Awards. In 2018, together with Hakan Emre Ünal and Ayşe Draz, she founded the professional theatre group Tiyatro Hemhal in Istanbul.

In the 2020 movie İnsanlar İkiye Ayrılır she portrayed the character of Tilbe. For this role, she shared the Best Supporting Actress award at the 57th Antalya Golden Orange Film Festival with Nalan Kuruçim. In 2021, she played the character Serpil in Selman Nacar's first feature film İki Şafak Arasında, for which she was awarded the Best Supporting Actress award at the 58th Antalya Golden Orange Film Festival.

Filmography

Theatre

Awards and nominations

References

External links 
 

1990 births
Living people
Turkish film actresses
Turkish stage actresses
Turkish television actresses
Galatasaray University alumni
Kadir Has University alumni